Lieutenant-Colonel Michael Jaffray Hynman Allenby, 3rd Viscount Allenby (20 April 1931 – 3 October 2014), was a British politician and hereditary peer.

Early life
He was the great-nephew of Edmund Allenby, 1st Viscount Allenby, famed commander during the Second Boer War and the First World War.

The only child of Dudley Allenby, 2nd Viscount Allenby, and his first wife, Gertrude Mary Lethbridge (née Champneys) Allenby (d.1988).

He attended Eton and at the Royal Military Academy Sandhurst. He was commissioned a lieutenant in the 11th Hussars (later the Royal Hussars), which was stationed in Malaya between 1953 and 1956. He then served as aide-de-camp to the Governor of Cyprus (1957–1958), brigade major of the 51st Brigade in Hong Kong (1967–1969) and as commander of the Territorial Army Royal Yeomanry (1974–1977).

Political career
After inheriting the title in 1984, Lord Allenby served as Deputy Speaker of the House of Lords from 1993 to 1999. Having lost his automatic right to a seat under the House of Lords Act 1999, he was elected to remain and sat as a crossbencher.

He had also been a patron of The British-Israel-World Federation, and he had been aiding and consulting excavations at Megiddo.

Personal life
Allenby married Sara Margaret Wiggin in 1965, daughter of Lieutenant-Colonel Peter Milner Wiggin and Margaret Frances Livingstone-Learmonth. They had one son, Henry Jaffnay Hynman Allenby, who succeeded as 4th Viscount in 2014.

Allenby had a lifelong interest in animal welfare, particularly equestrian welfare, and was patron of the International League for the Protection of Horses.

Arms

References

External links

1931 births
2014 deaths
11th Hussars officers
British Army personnel of the Malayan Emergency
British Israelism
Crossbench hereditary peers
People educated at Eton College
People educated at West Downs School
Place of birth missing
Place of death missing
Royal Hussars officers
Royal Yeomanry officers
Viscount Allenby
Hereditary peers elected under the House of Lords Act 1999